Cyclanorbinae, also known commonly as the flapshell turtles, is a subfamily of softshell turtles in the family Trionychidae. The subfamily is native to Africa and Asia.

Taxonomy 
Morphological evidence supports Cyclanorbinae being the sister group to the Plastomeninae, an extinct subfamily of softshell turtles that inhabited North America from the Cretaceous to the Eocene.

Genera
The subfamily Cyclanorbinae contains the following three extant genera.

Cyclanorbis 
Cycloderma 
Lissemys 

One extinct prehistoric genus is also known from fossil remains: Nemegtemys , from the Cretaceous of Mongolia.

Geographic range
Species in the genera Cyclanorbis and Cycloderma are found in Africa; species in the genus Lissemys are found in Asia.

References

Further reading
Lydekker R (1889). Catalogue of the Fossil Reptilia and Amphibia in the British Museum (Natural History). Part III. Containing the Order Chelonia. London: Trustees of the British Museum (Natural History). (Taylor and Francis, printers). xviii + 239 pp. (Cyclanorbinae, new subfamily, p. x).

 
Reptile subfamilies
Taxa named by Richard Lydekker